Fynch is a surname. Notable people with the surname include:

Martin Fynch ( 1628–1698), English ejected minister
Vincent Fynch (disambiguation), multiple people

See also
Finch (surname)
Lynch (surname)